Philippines men's national softball team is the national team for the Philippines.  The 1988 World Championships were held in Saskatoon, Canada.  The team played 13 games in the round robin round.  They finished eighth overall. The team competed at the 1992 ISF Men's World Championship in Manila, Philippines where they finished with 5 wins and 3 losses.  The team competed at the 2000 ISF Men's World Championship in East London, South Africa where they finished tenth. The team competed at the 2004 ISF Men's World Championship in Christchurch, New Zealand where they finished tenth.  The team competed at the 2009 ISF Men's World Championship in Saskatoon, Saskatchewan where they finished tenth. They would participate in most of the succeeding editions. However from 2009 to 2022, they maintained a losing streak in the competition until their 8–0 win over Denmark in 2022.

They have won all editions of the Southeast Asian Games were softball has been featured except in the 1997 and 2019 edition where they placed second.

Competition results

World Championship

Southeast Asian Games

References

Men's national softball teams
softball
Men's sports in the Philippines
Softball in the Philippines